George Nenyi Kojo Andah (born 27 April 1970 ) is a Ghanaian politician and the former Member of Parliament of the Awutu Senya West Constituency in the Central Region of Ghana. He is a member of the New Patriotic Party and the Deputy Minister for communications in Ghana.

In June 2021, he was installed as the Akyempim Odefey (Chief) of the Senya Beraku Traditional Area and goes by the stool name, Nenyi Kobena Andakwei VI.

Early life and education
George was born on 27 April 1970 and hails from Senya Beraku in the Central Region of Ghana. He had his secondary education at Achimota School and proceeded to KNUST where he studied for a bachelor's degree in Biochemistry. George also holds an MBA degree in marketing from the University of Ghana Business School.

Career 
George has worked for several reputable companies; from being the marketing director of Guinness Ghana Breweries Ltd to being the Chief Marketing Officer for Scancom Limited. He was a member of the MTN Group to being the Chief Marketing Officer of Bharti Airtel Nigeria, a member of the Bharti Group to Chief Operating Officer (Country Manager) of Glo Mobile Ghana to the Regional Director, Marketing Promotions, Globacom (Nigeria, Ghana and Benin). He then went on to establish his own company called, RUDDER Solutions, a Ghanaian-based market-development management consultancy service that provides a comprehensive set of integrated professional services for business / market development, corporate / brand communication, reputation management, direct sales, channel development and leadership coaching. He also worked at the Accra main branch of SG-SSB from March 2001 to April 2002. He is also the Member of Parliament for the Awutu Senya West Constituency in the 7th Parliament of the 4th Republic and the Deputy Minister for Communications.

Awards and recognition
 Received the CIMG Marketing man of the year in 2008.
 He was installed as a Chief
 He won Humanitarian MP of the year award 2019
 He received the United Clergy International Association (UCIA) 2019
 He was honored as the MTN Mobile Money Builder Award in 2019.

Politics 
George is a founding member of Occupy Ghana a political pressure group. He was also the New Patriotic Party parliamentarian for Awutu-Senya West constituency.

In June, 2020 he was elected by the delegates of the NPP to represent Awutu-Senya West Constituency  in the 2020 Ghanaian general election as their parliamentary candidate. He lost his parliamentary seat to Gizella Tetteh-Agbotui of the National Democratic Congress. He is a former Deputy Minister for Communications.

In April 2022, he launched his book called 'Determined to do more'.

Personal life 
George is married with four children and lives in Accra with his family. He is a Christian.

Philanthropy 
In April 2019, George presented about 12 executive chairs to the Department of Marketing and Entrepreneurship at the University of Ghana Business School.

References

Ghanaian businesspeople
Government ministers of Ghana
Living people
Ghanaian MPs 2017–2021
New Patriotic Party politicians
People from Central Region (Ghana)
Alumni of Achimota School
1970 births
People from Accra